Machiel is a commune in the Somme department in Hauts-de-France in northern France.

Geography

Population

Monument aux morts

The Machiel monument aux morts features a sculpture by Albert-Dominique Roze. A montage of photographs of this monument aux morts is shown below.

See also
Communes of the Somme department
 War memorials (Western Somme)

References

Communes of Somme (department)